The Pârâul Băutor (also: Ivo) is a left tributary of the river Târnava Mare, in Romania. It flows into the Târnava Mare in Sub Cetate.

References

Rivers of Romania
Rivers of Harghita County